Deborah Flemma Stanley is an American lawyer and academic administrator who served as president of the State University of New York at Oswego from August 1, 1997 until December 2021.  She was appointed Interim Chancellor of the State University of New York on December 20, 2021. She took office as Chancellor on January 14, 2022.

Early life and education 
Stanley was born and raised in Utica, New York. She earned a B.A. in English from Syracuse University and a JD from Syracuse University College of Law in 1977. She is admitted to the New York State Bar Association.

Career 
Stanley was appointed president at SUNY Oswego on August 1, 1997, after serving on an interim basis from 1995 to 1997. She previously served as vice president for Academic Affairs, Provost, and executive assistant to the president. Stanley has also served as a commissioner for the American Council on Education. She is a member of American Association of State Colleges and Universities Women Presidents group, and sits on the Board of Directors of Alliance Bank and Metropolitan Development Association, and is Vice President of the Metropolitan Development Foundation of Syracuse.

In 2019, Stanley was named as a co-chair of the Central New York Regional Economic Development Council, a division of the Empire State Development Corporation.

On December 20, 2021, the State University of New York Board of Trustees appointed Stanley as Interim Chancellor, after the resignation of Jim Malatras.

Awards
In 2022, she received the Donna Shavlik Award from the American Council on Education.

References

Presidents of campuses of the State University of New York
Living people
Syracuse University College of Law alumni
People from Utica, New York
Year of birth missing (living people)